Saurodactylus mauritanicus is a species of gecko in the Sphaerodactylidae family found in Morocco, Western Sahara, and possibly Algeria. Both this species and Saurodactylus brosseti were both commonly known as the Morocco lizard-fingered gecko, and were both considered conspecific.
Its natural habitats are temperate forests, rocky areas, arable land, and pastureland.
It is threatened by habitat loss.

References

Saurodactylus
Reptiles described in 1836
Taxa named by André Marie Constant Duméril
Taxa named by Gabriel Bibron